Punctum Books, stylized as punctum books, is an open-access and print-on-demand independent, scholar-led publisher based in Santa Barbara, California, United States.

History
The imprint was co-founded in 2011 by Eileen A. Joy (a medievalist and advocate of open access) and Nicola Masciandaro (Brooklyn College, CUNY), who left the project in 2012. The imprint was conceived partly as an offshoot of the BABEL Working Group, a "non-hierarchical scholarly collective" with an emphasis on medieval studies. Punctum Books was joined in 2016 by co-director Vincent W.J. van Gerven Oei. Since its inception, Punctum Books has sought to bring scholarly works, often with a transdisciplinary or unconventional nature, to a broader public. It publishes print editions through Kindle Direct Publishing, but buyers can get a PDF version of the book for free through the publisher's website.

In the past, Punctum Books published issues of the journals Anarchist Developments in Cultural Studies, Badiou Studies, Contention: The Multidisciplinary Journal of Social Protest, Helvete: A Journal of Black Metal Theory, Itineration: Cross-Disciplinary Studies in Rhetoric, Media and Culture, Networks and Neighbours, O-Zone: A Journal of Object Oriented Studies, Radical Criminology, and Speculations: A Journal of Speculative Realism.

See also

 Open Book Publishers
 Open Humanities Press
 re.press

References

External links

Open access publishers
Academic publishing
Electronic publishing
Scholarly communication
Digital press